Knightstown (also ) is a village and the largest settlement on Valentia Island, County Kerry, in Ireland. It lies within the townland of Farranreagh, at the eastern tip of the island. As of the CSO census of 2016, Knightstown had a population of 243.

History 
In 1830 Maurice FitzGerald, the 18th Knight of Kerry, commissioned Scottish engineer Alexander Nimmo to draw up plans for a new village. During the 1840s, development began on what was initially known as the New Town of Valentia.

Locality 
The local RNLI lifeboat station moved to Knightstown in 1869 from Reenard Point and has since been known as the Valentia Lifeboat Station. There is a selection of local coffee shops and bars in the town, as well as Roman Catholic and Church of Ireland churches.

Knightstown is also the location of the car ferry connection between Valentia Island and Reenard Point on the mainland.

The area served as a base of operations for the laying of the first successful Transatlantic telegraph cable to Heart's Content, completed in 1866.  A cable station operated until it was closed in 1966.   The history of the transatlantic cable and artifacts from it can be seen at the local history museum located in Knightstown.

Knightstown participates in the annual "Tidy Towns" competition where it is regularly recognized for the quality and cleanliness of its environment.

See also 
 List of towns and villages in Ireland
 List of RNLI stations

References 

Towns and villages in County Kerry
Planned communities in the Republic of Ireland